Margaux Avril (born in Paris, France, on 8 April 1991) is a French singer. She is signed to the French AZ label.

She studied piano and photography. After meeting guitarist Tristan Salvati, they collaborated as an artistic duo gaining fame online after releasing online materials. The recording of "L'air de rien" gained notability first on Noomiz online website and was released on AZ label charting both in France and Belgium.

Discography

Albums

Singles

References

External links
Official website
Facebook

1991 births
Living people
Singers from Paris
21st-century French women singers